Spondyloepimetaphyseal dysplasia, Pakistani type is a form of spondyloepimetaphyseal dysplasia involving PAPSS2 (also known as "ATPSK2"). The condition is rare.

Signs and symptoms

This condition is a skeletal dysplasia characterized by short stature, mild brachydactyly, kyphoscoliosis, abnormal gait, enlarged knee joints, precocious osteoarthropathy, platyspondyly, delayed epiphyseal ossification, mild metaphyseal abnormalities, short stature and short and bowed legs. Intelligence is normal.

Some patients may manifest premature pubarche and hyperandrogenism.

Other features that may form part of the syndrome include precocious costal calcification, small iliac bones, short femoral necks, coxa vara, short halluces and fused vertebral bodies.

Genetics

This condition is inherited in an autosomal recessive fashion. It is due to mutations in the Bifunctional 3'-phosphoadenosine 5'-phosphosulfate synthetase 2 (PAPSS2) gene which is located on the long arm of chromosome 10 (10q23.2-q23.31).

Diagnosis

Radiology

Radiographic features include delayed epiphyseal ossification at the hips and knees, platyspondyly with irregular end plates and narrowed joint spaces, diffuse early osteoarthritic changes (in the spine and hands), mild brachydactyly and mild metaphyseal abnormalities which predominantly involve the hips and knees.

Treatment

History

This condition was first described in a large eight generation consanguineous Pakistani family.

The causative mutation was identified in 1998.

References

External links 

Proteoglycan metabolism disorders